Herbert LeGrande St. John (January 17, 1926 — June 29, 2011) was a professional American football guard. He played two seasons in the All-America Football Conference.

References

1926 births
2011 deaths
People from Perry, Florida
Players of American football from Florida
American football offensive guards
Georgia Bulldogs football players
Brooklyn Dodgers (AAFC) players
Chicago Hornets players